Carsten Brandenborg (born 26 August 1945) is a Danish footballer. He played in one match for the Denmark national football team in 1972.

References

External links
 
 

1945 births
Living people
Danish men's footballers
Denmark international footballers
Footballers from Aarhus
Association football midfielders
Randers FC players